The Moon Maiden is a science fiction novel by Garrett P. Serviss.  It was first published in book form in 1978 by William L. Crawford, without imprint, in an edition of 500 copies.  The novel originally appeared in the magazine Argosy in 1915.

Plot introduction
The novel concerns a love tale and lunar beings who have been guiding the earth for millennia.

References

1915 American novels
1915 science fiction novels
American science fiction novels
Works originally published in Argosy (magazine)